Pipecleaner Glacier is a glacier formed by the coalescence of numerous small alpine glaciers on the east side of Mount Huggins. Together with Glimpse Glacier it joins the Radian Glacier where that stream meets the north arm of Dismal Ridge. Its surface is marked by innumerable bands of moraine reminiscent of pipecleaners. Named by New Zealand Victoria University of Wellington Antarctic Expedition (VUWAE), 1960–61.

Glaciers of Victoria Land
Scott Coast